Urmia University of Technology was formed and started to work in summer 2007. Following the principled agreement of UUT establishment and with the special consideration of president Dr. Ahmadinejad and the officials attempts, an independent funding (budget) based on Iran government proposal and the Islamic parliament approval was allocated to the university. Obtaining educational and research activities permission in Information Technology (IT), Mechanical, and Industrial engineering, UUT officially started in February, 2007.

References 

 Urmia University of Technology

Universities in Iran
Education in Urmia
Educational institutions established in 2007
2007 establishments in Iran
Education in West Azerbaijan Province
Buildings and structures in West Azerbaijan Province